Judo at the 2010 Asian Games was held in Guangzhou, China between 13 and 16 November 2010. All competition held in the Huagong Gymnasium.

Schedule

Medalists

Men

Women

Medal table

Participating nations
A total of 231 athletes from 32 nations competed in judo at the 2010 Asian Games:

References

Men's Results
Women's Results

External links
 Judo site of 2010 Asian Games
 

 
2010 Asian Games events
2010
Asian Games
Judo competitions in China